Erupa nampa is a moth in the family Crambidae. It was described by Schaus in 1929. It is found in Brazil (Santa Catharina).

References

Erupini
Moths described in 1929